Lake Monroe is an unincorporated community in Seminole County, Florida, United States. Its ZIP code is 32747. Florida Action Committee, a nonprofit advocacy group for sex offenders and their families is headquartered here.

Notes

Unincorporated communities in Seminole County, Florida
Unincorporated communities in Florida